William Weintraub  (February 19, 1926 – November 6, 2017) was a Canadian documentarian/filmmaker, journalist and author, best known for his long career with the National Film Board of Canada (NFB).

Early life
Weintraub was born in Montreal, to Louis Weintraub and Mina Blumer Weintraub, and grew up in the blue-collar neighbourhood of Verdun. His father had been a stock broker; he lost everything in the Wall Street Crash of 1929 and worked as the manager of a corner store. William studied English Literature and political science at McGill University, where he had worked on the McGill Daily. In 1947, he took the job of a ski reporter at The Montreal Gazette, from which he was fired for trying to unionize. His time at the Gazette was the basis for his 1961 novel Why Rock the Boat?, which director John Howe turned into a film in 1974.

Career
From 1951 to 1955, Weintraub worked as a copy editor at Weekend Picture Magazine. He became interested in the new medium of television and, in 1955, after taking a two-week course in script-writing, started freelancing as a writer with the CBC and the NFB.

In 1965, he joined the NFB staff and stayed until his retirement in 1987, writing, producing and/or directing 115 documentaries and short films. Productions ranged from Canada: Beef Cattle to historical documentaries to a portrait of Canadian writer Margaret Laurence.  His final documentary The Rise and Fall of English Montreal dealt with the second large Quebec diaspora that began in the 1960s and accelerated rapidly after the 1976 Quebec election. The National Post wrote that he said that Torontonians should express their gratitude to a major benefactor of the city and erect a very large heroic statue at the head of Bay Street of former Premier of Quebec René Lévesque.

From 1975 to 1976, Weintraub was the director, National Film Board studio in Nairobi, Kenya. He served on the international jury of the Kraków Film Festival and was on the board of the Quebec Council for the Diffusion of Cinema. He was a member of the Canadian delegation that visited China's film industry in 1977, a delegate to the UNESCO Conference on Film and Television, and was a recipient of a Canada Council Senior Arts Fellowship.

Weintraub published four books after his seventieth birthday, including City Unique (1996), an exploration of English Montreal in the 1940s and 1950s, which received the QSPELL Prize for Non-Fiction from the Quebec Writers' Federation Awards.

Among Weintraub's contemporaries and friends were Mordecai Richler, Mavis Gallant, Norman Levine and Brian Moore. His correspondence with these writers was the basis of his 2001 memoir Getting Started.

Weintraub's satirical 1979 novel The Underdogs provoked controversy by imagining a future socialist republic of Quebec, in which English-speakers were an oppressed minority, complete with a violent resistance movement. One planned stage version was cancelled before its premiere, but another version was later a hit at the Just For Laughs festival.

Personal life
Weintraub's first marriage, to Bernice Grafstein ended in divorce. In 1967, he married Madga Landau, who had emigrated to Canada from Poland; they remained married until her death in 2012. Neither marriage prodced children.

From an early age, Weintraub suffered from depression. He dealt with it with Psychoanalysis, Electroconvulsive therapy and, eventually, by abstaining from alcohol.

Legacy

In 2003, Weintraub was invested as an Officer of the Order of Canada.

In 2018, McGill University established the William Weintraub Prize in memory of William and Magda. It is an annual cash award, given by the university's Quebec Studies Program to one undergraduate student exploring the politics and culture of Quebec and Montreal.

Filmography
(All for the National Film Board of Canada)

Carnival - documentary short, Julian Biggs 1955 - writer
Road of Iron - documentary short, Walford Hewitson 1955 - writer 
New Hearts for Old - TV series episode, Jean Lenauer 1955 - writer 
Embassy - documentary short, Don Haldane 1956 - writer
Is It a Woman’s World? - documentary short, Don Haldane 1956 - writer
Stress - documentary short, Ian MacNeill 1956 - writer
Canadians Abroad - documentary short, Don Haldane 1956 - writer 
Fighter Wing – documentary short, Don Haldane 1956 - writer 
Saskatchewan Traveller - documentary short, Don Haldane 1956 - writer 
Portrait of the Family - documentary short, Ronald Dick 1957 - writer
The Invisible Keystone - documentary short, Ronald Dick 1957 - writer 
Four Centuries of Growing Pains - documentary short, Ronald Dick, Nicholas Balla 1957 - writer 
The Colonies Look Ahead - documentary short, Ronald Dick 1957 - writer 
Can It Hold Together?  - documentary short, Ronald Dick 1957 
Crisis in Asia - documentary short, Ronald Dick 1957 
The Ghost That Talked - documentary short, Don Haldane 1957 - writer
A Letter from Oxford - documentary short, Julian Biggs 1957 
Colonialism: Ogre or Angel? - documentary short, John Howe 1957 
Million Dollar Smile - TV series episode, David Boisseau 1957 - writer
Storm Clouds Over the Colonies - documentary short, Ronald Dick 1957 - writer 
Ten Days That Shook the Commonwealth - documentary short, Ronald Dick 1957 - writer 
Poverty and Plenty - documentary short, John Howe 1957 - writer
Road to Independence - documentary short, Ronald Dick 1957 - writer
They Called It White Man’s Burden - documentary short, John Howe 1957 - writer 
Black and White in South Africa - documentary short, John Howe & Ronald Dick 1957 - writer 
First Novel - documentary short, Donald Wilder 1958 - writer 
School for the Stage - documentary short, Julian Biggs 1958 - writer 
Canada: World Citizen - documentary short, Julian Biggs 1959 - writer 
Correlieu - documentary short, Jean Palardy 1959 - writer
In the Beginning a Wilderness of Air - documentary short, Richard Gilbert 1959 - writer 
Double Heritage - documentary short, Richard Gilbert 1959 - writer 
The Golden Age - documentary short, Richard Gilbert 1959 - writer 
Sunshine and Eclipse (1927-1934) - documentary short 1960 - writer and producer 
The Good, Bright Days (1919-1927) - documentary short 1960 - writer and producer 
Twilight of an Era: 1934-1939 - documentary short 1960 - writer and producer 
Thousand Islands Summer - documentary short, Roger Blais 1960 - writer 
Sun, Sand and Sea: The Region - documentary short, James Beveridge 1961 - writer
The Awakening - documentary short, James Beveridge 1961 - writer
Vote for Michalski - documentary short, John Howe 1961 - writer 
Yukon Old, Yukon New - documentary short, John Howe 1962 - writer
Sun, Sand and Sea - documentary short, James Beveridge 1962 - writer
Aspirations - documentary short, James Beveridge 1962 - writer
The Impact of the West - documentary short, James Beveridge 1962 - writer
Nahanni - documentary short, Donald Wilder 1962 - writer 
The Contest for Power - documentary short, James Beveridge 1962 - writer
New Voices - documentary short, James Beveridge 1962 - writer
The Rough Road to Freedom - documentary short, James Beveridge 1961 - writer
Drylanders - documentary, Don Haldane 1963 - writer
Fisherman’s Gamble - documentary short, Ray Jones 1963 - writer
Anniversary - short film 1963 - writer, producer and director 
Background to Latin America - documentary short, James Beveridge 1963 - writer
Canada Between Two World Wars - documentary short 1963 - writer and producer 
Canada: Human Vaccine - documentary short, Hector Lemieux 1963 - writer
Canada: Beef Cattle - documentary short, Hector Lemieux 1963 - writer
Canada: Calf Leather - documentary short, Hector Lemieux 1963 - writer
Canada: Heating Units - documentary short, Hector Lemieux 1963 - writer 
The Visit - documentary short John Kemeny 1964 - writer 
Turn of the Century - documentary short 1964 - writer and producer 
Haida Carver - documentary short, Richard Gilbert 1964 - writer
Landfall Asia - documentary short, Gordon Sparling 1964 - writer 
Magic Molecule - documentary short, Hugh O'Connor & Christopher Chapman 1964 - writer 
The Way of Science - documentary short, Guy L. Coté 1965 - writer 
Trans-Canada Journey - documentary short, Graham Parker 1965 - writer
Celebration - documentary short, 1966 - with Rex Tasker, producer and director 
Reception - documentary short, Douglas Jackson 1967 - writer 
New England and New France: 1490-1763 - documentary, Ronald Dick & Pierre L’Amare 1967 - writer 
Canada and the American Revolution: 1763-1783 - documentary, Ronald Dick & Pierre L’Amare 1967 - writer
The War of 1812: Causes and Consequences: 1783-1818 - documentary, Ronald Dick & Pierre L’Amare 1967 - writer 
People of the Buffalo - documentary short, Austin Campbell 1968 - writer
Dangerous Decades: 1818-1846 - documentary, Ronald Dick & Pierre L’Amare 1968 - writer 
The New Equation: Annexationism and Reciprocity: 1840-1860 - documentary, Ronald Dick & Pierre L’Amare 1968 - writer 
The Triumphant Union and the Canadian Confederation: 1863-1867 - documentary, Ronald Dick & Pierre L’Amare 1969 - writer 
The Border Confirmed: The Treaty of Washington: 1867-1871 - documentary, Ronald Dick & Pierre L’Amare 1969 - writer 
A Second Transcontinental Nation: 1872 - documentary, Ronald Dick & Pierre L’Amare 1969 - writer 
The Friendly 50s and the Sinister Sixties: 1850-1863 - documentary, Ronald Dick & Pierre L’Amare 1969 - writer 
Below Zero - documentary 1970, Michel Régnier 1970 - writer
A Matter of Fat - documentary 1970 - writer and director 
Challenge for the Church - documentary short 1972 - writer and director
The Aviators of Hudson Strait - documentary short 1973 - writer and producer 
Why Rock the Boat? - feature, John Howe 1974 - writer and producer
Drylanders, 2-4 - documentary, Don Haldane 1974 - writer
Seven Shades of Pale - documentary short, Les Rose 1975 - producer 
I’ve Never Walked the Steppes - documentary short, Jerry Krepakevich 1975 - producer
Kaszuby - documentary short, André Herman 1975 - producer
The World is Round - documentary short, Ian McLaren 1976 - producer
The Walls Come Tumbling Down - documentary short 1976. With Pierre Lasry & Michael Rubbo - director
Fort Good Hope - documentary, Ron Orieux 1977 - writer
Bekevar Jubilee - documentary short, Albert Kish 1977 - producer
Hold the Ketchup - documentary short, Albert Kish 1977 - producer
The Hottest Show on Earth animated short, Wolf Koenig, Derek Lamb & Terence Macartney-Filgate 1977 - writer 
Sub-Igloo - documentary short, James de Beaujeu Domville & Joseph B. MacInnis 1977 - writer
Our Kinda Talk: An Introduction to Margaret Laurence - documentary short, Robert Duncan 1978 - producer
Margaret Laurence, First Lady of Manawaka - documentary, Robert Duncan 1978 - producer
The Point - documentary, Robert Duncan 1978 - producer
Arthritis: A Dialogue with Pain - documentary, Susan Huycke 1981 - producer
The Concert Man - documentary short, Tony Ianzelo 1982 - writer 
Learning Ringette - documentary short, Bill Graziadei & Tony Ianzelo 1982 - producer
Overtime - documentary, Marrin Canell 1984 - producer 
To Set Our House in Order - documentary short, Anne Wheeler 1985 - producer
Going to War - documentary, Carol Moore-Ede 1985 - producer
The Concert Stages of Europe - documentary short, Giles Walker 1985 - producer
The Legs of the Lame - documentary short, Bruce Pittman 1985 - producer
Uncle T - short film, Douglas Jackson 1985 - producer
Mortimer Griffin and Shalinsky - short film, Mort Ransen 1985 - producer
Esso - short film, Don McBrearty 1985 - producer
The Sight - short film, Francis Mankiewicz 1985 - producer
Connection - short film, Wolf Koenig 1985 - producer
Happy Birthday, Hacker John - short film, Michael Keusch 1985 - producer
Jack of Hearts - short film, Cynthia Scott 1985 - producer
Red Shoes - short film, Allan Kroeker 1985 - producer
The Dream and the Triumph - short film, Bruce Pittman 1986 - producer
The Rebellion of Young David - short film, John N. Smith 1986 - producer
Hotwalker - short film, Gil Cardinal 1986 - producer
The Trumpeter - short film, Janice L. Platt 1986 - producer
The Rise and Fall of English Montreal - documentary 1993 - writer and director

Awards

Anniversary (1963) 
 16th Canadian Film Awards, Toronto: Genie Award for Best Theatrical Short Film, 1964

Celebration (1966)
 La Plata International Children's Film Festival, La Plata, Argentina: First Prize, Special Films, 1967

A Matter of Fat
 22nd Canadian Film Awards, Toronto: Best Film Over 30 Minutes, 1970
 Atlanta Film Festival, Atlanta: Gold Medal, 1971
 Atlanta Film Festival, Atlanta: Special Jury Award, 1971
 American Film and Video Festival, New York: Blue Ribbon, 1971

Jack of Hearts (1985) 
 Chicago International Children's Film Festival, Chicago: Second Prize - Live-Action Film Under 30 Minutes, 1986
 National Educational Media Network Competition, Oakland, California: Honorable Mention, Literary Adaptations, Elementary, 1986

Mortimer Griffin and Shalinsky (1985)
 American Film and Video Festival, New York: Red Ribbon, Literary Adaptations, 1986

Red Shoes (1985)  
Columbus International Film & Animation Festival, Columbus, Ohio: Bronze Plaque - Arts and Culture, 1986. 
 Chicago International Children's Film Festival, Chicago: Honorable Mention, Live-Action Film Under 30 Minutes, 1986

Bibliography
 Why Rock the Boat?: A Novel (1961)
 The Underdogs (1979)
 City Unique: Montreal Days and Nights in the 1940s and '50s (1996)
 The Underdogs: A Play (1998)
 Getting Started: A Memoir of the 1950s (2001)
 Crazy About Lili (2005)

References

External links
 
 William Weintraub profile at the Writers' Union of Canada
Making Movie History: William Weintraub Interview

1926 births
2017 deaths
Canadian male journalists
Canadian male novelists
Officers of the Order of Canada
McGill University alumni
Writers from Montreal
Anglophone Quebec people
National Film Board of Canada people
Canadian documentary film producers
Montreal Gazette people
Film directors from Montreal
Film producers from Quebec
Canadian male screenwriters
Jewish Canadian journalists
Jewish Canadian filmmakers
20th-century Canadian male writers
20th-century Canadian novelists
20th-century Canadian screenwriters